Tlaquepaque Stadium is a 1,360 seat stadium that was built in 2011 to host the rugby sevens competition at the 2011 Pan American Games.

References 

Sports venues completed in 2011
Venues of the 2011 Pan American Games
Sports venues in Guadalajara, Jalisco